John Osborn (born May 16, 1972) is an American operatic tenor.  He is particularly associated with the bel canto repertoire, especially the works of Rossini, and roles in French Grand Opera.

He was born in Sioux City, Iowa, and studied music at Simpson College.  He made his professional debut in The Saint of Bleecker Street at the Des Moines Metro Opera in 1993.

Osborn was a winner of the Metropolitan Opera National Council Auditions in 1994 at the age of 21. He made his Met debut in Salome in 1996, and has subsequently sung the roles of Don Ottavio in Don Giovanni and Count Almaviva in The Barber of Seville, Goffredo in Armida, Rodrigo di Dhu in La donna del lago, and Arnold Melchtal in Guillaume Tell with the company.

In 2007, he made his role debut as Arnold in Rossini's opera William Tell, with Antonio Pappano conducting the Orchestra and Chorus of the Accademia Nazionale di Santa Cecilia, a role he has since repeated at the Royal Opera House, London, Theater an der Wien, Grand Théâtre de Genève, The Metropolitan Opera, Dutch National Opera, Opéra de Lyon, Teatro Regio di Torino and his debut at Carnegie Hall with Maestro Gianandrea Noseda and the Teatro Regio di Torino (Italian version). In 2011 he appeared in the very demanding leading role of Raoul in Meyerbeer's grand opera Les Huguenots at La Monnaie, Brussels. John Osborn has sung the title of role of Rossini's Otello at the Opéra de Lausanne, Switzerland, Teatro San Carlo di Napoli, Italy, and also in Vienna, Paris, Lyon, Zurich and Salzburg Festspielhaus, among other venues.

Further lead roles in French opera repertoire include Roméo in Roméo et Juliette at the Salzburg Festival and the Arena di Verona Festival, Hoffmann in ‘’Les contes d’Hoffmann with Opéra de Lyon, Dutch National Opera, and Teatro San Carlo di Napoli; Des Grieux in Manon at the Opéra de Lausanne, Teatro Colon Buenos Aires, and the  title role of Benvenuto Cellini for Dutch National Opera and the Gran Teatre del Liceu, Opera di Roma, Italy; Prince Léopold in La Juive at the Opéra National de Paris Bastille, Zurich Opernhaus, Dutch National Opera, and Munich Opera Festival,; Werther with Oper Frankfurt am Main; and the title role in Auber's Fra Diavolo for the Opera di Roma.

In 2017 the tenor won widespread acclaim for his performances in the leading role of Jean de Leyde in Meyerbeer's Le prophète in two different productions, one at the Théâtre du Capitole de Toulouse and the other at the Aalto-Musiktheater Essen.

John Osborn is the recipient of the 2011 Goffredo Petrassi Award for his contributions to Italian culture, 2012 Aureliano Pertile Award in Asti, Italy for his portrayal as Roméo at the Arena di Verona; 2014 Premio Bellini D’Oro in Catania, Sicily for his Elvino in La sonnambula in Bari’s Teatro Petruzzelli and Alfredo Germont in La traviata at the Arena di Verona; 2016 "Prix d’Amis" from the Friends of the Dutch National Opera for his performances as Cellini in Benvenuto Cellini; the Italian “Franco Abbiati” Critics Award for best “Male Singer” for his critically acclaimed performances as Fernand in La favorite in Teatro La Fenice, Cellini in Benvenuto Cellini at Teatro dell’opera di Roma, and his Otello in Otello: ossia il moro di Venezia by Rossini at the Teatro San Carlo di Napoli in the season 2016; and most recently the Italian "Oscar della Lirica" from Fondazione Arena di Verona in the category of "Best Tenor" 2016/17 (Awards Ceremony held in Haiku, Hainan, China).

Audio recordings include ‘’Tribute to Gilbert Duprez’’ with Constantine Oberlian and the Kaunas Symphony Orchestra on Delos Records,L'amour consacré and La coppia degli acuti with wife and soprano, Lynette Tapia, Christopher Larkin conducting the English Chamber Orchestra; Guillaume Tell (the complete French version) with Antonio Pappano and the Accademia Nazionale di Santa Cecilia; and Norma on Decca label with Cecilia Bartoli, Sumi Jo, and Michele Pertusi.

Video recordings include the operas Clari by Fromental Halévy (DVD: Decca); Armida by Gioachino Rossini (The Met Live in HD: Decca); and I puritani by Vincenzo Bellini (DVD: Opus Arte), Benvenuto Cellini by Hector Berlioz staged by Terry Gilliam (TV), and also Les contes d'Hoffmann by Jacques Offenbach staged by Laurent Pelly (Opéra de Lyon Japan Tour's televised by NHK).

Osborn is an alumnus of the Music Academy of the West summer conservatory program, where he attended in 1997.

References

External links
John Osborn's official website
Zemsky/Green Artists Management- Agent Site
Royal Opera House - People

American operatic tenors
Living people
Singers from Iowa
1970s births
People from Sioux City, Iowa
20th-century American male opera singers
21st-century American male opera singers
Simpson College alumni
Winners of the Metropolitan Opera National Council Auditions
Music Academy of the West alumni